Vrdy is a municipality and village in Kutná Hora District in the Central Bohemian Region of the Czech Republic. It has about 3,000 inhabitants.

Administrative parts
Villages of Dolní Bučice, Horní Bučice and Zbyslav are administrative parts of Vrdy.

Geography
It lies in a flat agricultural landscape of the Central Elbe Table. The Doubrava River flows through the municipality.

History
The first written mention of Vrdy is from 1307. Until 1960, Dolní Bučice, Horní Bučice and Zbyslav were separate municipalities.

Sights
The Church of All Saints in Dolní Bučice is a late Neoclassical church from the mid-19th century. It was probably built on the site of a demolished medieval church.

Notable people
Karel Petr (1868–1950), mathematician
Jiří Hanke (1924–2006), football player and manager

References

External links

Villages in Kutná Hora District